The World RX of South Africa is a Rallycross event held in South Africa for the FIA World Rallycross Championship. The event made its début in the 2017 season, at the Killarney Motor Racing Complex in Cape Town.

Past winners

References

External links

South Africa
Motorsport competitions in South Africa